Why Don't You? was a BBC children's television series broadcast in 42 series between 20 August 1973 and 21 April 1995. It was originally broadcast in the morning during the school summer holidays and once was shown during the weekday evening children's TV slot around 4:45 to 5:45.  Later it went out during the Easter and Christmas school holidays although it was also broadcast once on Saturday mornings. The format consisted of groups or "gangs" of children responding to letters from viewers who wrote into the show suggesting games, 'makes' and days out. Typically these were arts-and-crafts activities or games and magic tricks children could learn to impress their friends.

Created by producer/director Patrick Dowling at the BBC's Bristol studios, Russell T Davies was later at one time a producer and director for Why Don't You...? before going on to greater fame as writer of Queer as Folk and producer of the 2005 revival of Doctor Who. Under Davies's direction, the format of the series shifted from magazine show to drama, with plots frequently centring on harebrained young Welsh presenter Ben Slade and his increasingly elaborate inventions. Slade was the longest serving presenter in the show's 22-year run.
During the Russell T Davies Ben Slade era viewing figures rose from 0.9 to 3 million up against stiff competition on ITV. Slade and Davies reunited in 2019 in a BBC Radio Wales documentary, first broadcast in December of that year.

Geographical variations 
The 1972 pilot for Why Don't You was filmed in Henley-on-Thames, Oxfordshire, with a team of children from Valley Road Primary School.
From its inception in 1973, the gang's studio had been based in Bristol and resembled a dusty basement; however, from 1980 the show also featured gangs from other parts of the United Kingdom, and these shows were made by the respective BBC regional centre, although all were broadcast nationwide. The first "alternative" gangs came from a barn in Scotland and a church hall in Belfast, followed by a seaside café in Cardiff.  As the 1980s continued, all four studio settings were abandoned and the gang became based in other UK locations.

Theme tune
There were a few versions of the theme tune used over the years. 

The original 1973 theme was "I Say, I Say, I Say", from the De Wolfe Music Library, written by Paul Lewis and credited to The London Studio Group. This theme was retained until 1975.

In 1976 the theme changed to "Kings Road Raspberry Parade", written by Roger Greenaway & Roger Cook and performed by George Martin & His Orchestra. 

By 1979 the opening theme had changed to the "Why Don't You?" song, written by Faron Brooks. This series retained "Kings Road Raspberry Parade" as the closing theme.

By 1984 the opening song had been re-recorded by a children's choir.

By 1991 the theme tune had changed to one by Norman Cook. The last theme tune was introduced in 1994.

Notable presenters 

 Gideon Coe
 Andy Crane
 Daniel Evans
 Alexandra Fletcher
 Anthony McPartlin
 Pauline Quirke

See also 

 Wise Up

References

External links 
 Why Don't You? opening title sequence at bbc.co.uk
 Screenonline: Why Don't You?
 

1973 British television series debuts
1995 British television series endings
1970s British children's television series
1980s British children's television series
1990s British children's television series
BBC children's television shows
English-language television shows
Lost BBC episodes